Britta Bilač (née Vörös) (born 4 December 1968 in Saalfeld, Thuringia, East Germany) is a retired high jumper who competed internationally for Germany and Slovenia from 1992 onwards. Her greatest achievement was the European Championship victory in 1994 with a personal best jump of 2.00 m.

She won the 1989 Hochsprung mit Musik with a leap of 1.84 m.

Formerly representing East Germany, she married Slovenian long jumper Borut Bilač and thus became a Slovenian citizen in 1992.

Achievements

 Results in brackets indicate height achieved in qualifying round

References

1968 births
Living people
People from Saalfeld
Slovenian female high jumpers
East German female high jumpers
Athletes (track and field) at the 1992 Summer Olympics
Athletes (track and field) at the 1996 Summer Olympics
Olympic athletes of Slovenia
European Athletics Championships medalists
Sportspeople from Thuringia
Slovenian expatriate sportspeople in Germany
German people of Slovenian descent
Mediterranean Games gold medalists for Slovenia
Mediterranean Games bronze medalists for Slovenia
Mediterranean Games medalists in athletics
Athletes (track and field) at the 1993 Mediterranean Games
Athletes (track and field) at the 1997 Mediterranean Games